Bokang is a given name. Notable people with the name include:

Bokang Montjane (born 1986), South African model and beauty pageant titleholder
Bokang Mosena (born 1991), South African cricketer
Bokang Mothoana (born 1987), Mosotho footballer
Bokang Phelane, Lesotho-born South African actress